Clinical Otolaryngology is a bimonthly peer-reviewed medical journal covering the field of otorhinolaryngology. It was established in 1976 as Clinical Otolaryngology and Allied Sciences, obtaining its current title in 2005. It is published by Wiley-Blackwell and is an official journal of ENT UK. and the  British Otorhinolaryngology & Allied Sciences Research Society (BOARS). The journal's scope is described as"clinically-oriented research papers ... dealing with: current otorhinolaryngological practice; audiology, otology, balance, rhinology, larynx, voice and paediatric ORL; head and neck oncology; head and neck plastic and reconstructive surgery; and continuing medical education and ORL training."

History
The journal was first published in 1976, with Philip Stell and A. D. Cheesman as editors-in-chief. Volumes 1-29 appeared under the title Clinical Otolaryngology and Allied Sciences; volume 30, 2005, was the first with the current, shortened title.

Abstracting and indexing
The journal is abstracted and indexed in:
Current Contents/Clinical Medicine
EBSCO databases
Embase
Index Medicus/MEDLINE/PubMed
Science Citation Index
According to the Journal Citation Reports, the journal has a 2015 impact factor of 2.627.

References

External links

Bimonthly journals
Wiley-Blackwell academic journals
Publications established in 1976
English-language journals
Otorhinolaryngology journals